Stylidium muscicola is a dicotyledonous plant that belongs to the genus Stylidium (family Stylidiaceae) that was described by Ferdinand von Mueller in 1859. It is an erect annual plant that grows from 5 to 33 cm tall. Obovate or orbicular leaves, about 4-20 per plant, form terminal rosettes with some scattered along the stems. The leaves are generally 6–33 mm long and 5–28 mm wide. This species generally has one to eight scapes and cymose inflorescences that are 3–17 cm long. Flowers are white, pink, or mauve. S. muscicola's native range is concentrated in and around western Kimberley in Western Australia and extends to the northern parts of the Northern Territory and east almost to Queensland. Its typical habitat is a sheltered area along a sandstone ridge in sandy soils that remain moist in the dry seasons. It flowers in the southern hemisphere from February to September.

See also 
 List of Stylidium species

References 

Carnivorous plants of Australia
Flora of the Northern Territory
Eudicots of Western Australia
muscicola
Asterales of Australia
Taxa named by Ferdinand von Mueller